Frederick Kerr (born Frederick Grinham Keen, 11 October 1858 – 3 May 1933) was an English actor who appeared on stage in both London and New York and in British and American films; he also worked as a major theatrical manager in London.

Early life
Frederick Kerr was born Frederick Grinham Keen on 11 October 1858 in London, the elder son of Grinham Keen, a solicitor. He was educated at Charterhouse School and Caius College, Cambridge. After graduating from Cambridge in 1880, he enrolled at the Inner Temple with the intention of becoming a barrister, but left shortly afterwards to pursue a career as an actor.

Theatre career
He went to New York City in 1880 and worked as a sketch artist, when sheer chance turned him into an actor. He was living in a boarding house on 7th Avenue, where a number of theatrical people also lived, among them Henry Miller, who eventually became his manager. Osmond Tearle, an actor living there, heard from his own producer that an Englishman was needed for a production of The School for Scandal. Tearle recruited Frederick, who got the part in January 1882 (which is also likely the moment he took the stage surname of "Kerr"). He appeared in several more plays in New York City that year, but left for Britain to appear in a London play in December 1882, after which he joined the company at the Royal Court Theatre managed by John Clayton and Arthur Cecil. Over the next fifty years, he travelled back and forth across the Atlantic several times for theatrical work both in New York City and in London.

Kerr became actor-manager of the Vaudeville Theatre in London in 1895 and later managed the Royal Court Theatre. He starred in Public Opinion at Wyndham's Theatre in 1905 and also as the titular pirate in George Bernard Shaw's Captain Brassbound's Conversion at the Court Theatre in 1906.

Film career
In addition to his stage career, Kerr also appeared in 19 films between 1916 and 1933. He is best known as the old Baron Frankenstein in Frankenstein (1931).

Filmography

Writing career
His memoirs were published in 1930 under the title Recollections of a Defective Memory.

Personal life and death
Kerr married Lucy Houghton Dowson (b. 1864) in April 1894. They had three children: a son, Geoffrey Kemble Grinham Keen (1895–1971) who acted under the stage name Geoffrey Kerr; and two daughters, Lucy Joyce Gunning Keen (b. 1897) who married James Boswell Talbot, 3rd Baron Talbot de Malahide, and Frances Mary Keen (1904–1942), who was an actor and writer using the name Molly Kerr. His grandson was actor John Kerr.

Kerr was a heavy smoker and suffered from obesity in his later years. He died from the consequences of an earlier heart attack in a nursing home in London on 2 May 1933 at the age of 74. His interment was at Golders Green Crematorium.

References

External links

1858 births
1933 deaths
19th-century English male actors
20th-century English male actors
20th-century English non-fiction writers
English male film actors
English male silent film actors
English male stage actors
English memoirists
People educated at Charterhouse School
Alumni of Gonville and Caius College, Cambridge
Members of the Inner Temple
Male actors from London
Deaths from lung cancer